Sa'id ibn Malik ibn Bahdal was the governor of Jund Qinnasrin (military district of northern Syria) under the Umayyad caliphs Yazid I and Mu'awiya II. During the Second Muslim Civil War, in 683 or 684, Sa'id was expelled from Qinnasrin by Zufar ibn al-Harith al-Kilabi, whose tribal faction, the Qays, rivals of Sa'id's tribe, the Banu Kalb, dominated the district. Zufar objected to a Kalbite controlling Qinnasrin and supported the claims of the anti-Umayyad claimant to the caliphate, Ibn al-Zubayr.

Family
Sa'id was a cousin of Caliph Yazid I, the latter's mother Maysun being the sister of Sa'id's father Malik. They belonged to the influential house of Bahdal ibn Unayf, the chief of the Banu Kalb tribe in Syria. Sa'id's brother Hassan and cousin Humayd ibn Hurayth ibn Bahdal played leading roles in support of the Umayyads during the serious challenge to their rule in the Second Muslim Civil War. 

Another descendant, Asim ibn Muhammad, was a leader of the Yaman tribal faction, to which the Kalb belonged, against its rival, the Qays, in Damascus during the reign of the Abbasid caliph Harun al-Rashid.

References

Bibliography

7th-century Arabs
Banu Kalb
Umayyad governors of Qinnasrin
People of the Second Fitna